Guo Weicheng (1912 - January 1, 1995) was a major general of the People's Liberation Army, a politician of the People's Republic of China, and a former Minister of Railways of China.

Belonging to Manchu people, Guo was born in Yi County, Liaoning, and joined the Communist Party of China (CPC) in 1933. He graduated from the Department of Politics at Fudan University in Shanghai and obtained a bachelor's degree of law. Guo served as a key secretary to Zhang Xueliang. 

Guo attained the rank of major general in 1955.

References

Politicians from Jinzhou
People's Republic of China politicians from Liaoning
1912 births
1995 deaths
Chinese Communist Party politicians from Liaoning
People's Liberation Army generals from Liaoning